Goniothorax ruber is a species of crab in the family Epialtidae and the only species in the genus Goniothorax.

References

Majoidea
Monotypic crustacean genera